Knyazhensky 1-y is a rural locality (a khutor) in Mikhaylovka Urban Okrug, Volgograd Oblast, Russia. The population was 188 as of 2010. There are 10 streets.

Geography 
Knyazhensky 1-y is located 24 km southwest of Mikhaylovka. Knyazhensky 2-y is the nearest rural locality.

References 

Rural localities in Mikhaylovka urban okrug